The 1933–34 season was the 25th in the history of the Isthmian League, an English football competition.

Kingstonian were champions, winning their first Isthmian League title.

League table

References

Isthmian League seasons
I